This is a list of parks in Bucharest.

References

 
Bucharest
Parks